Holy Trinity Catholic High School is a secondary school located in the Kanata district of Ottawa, Ontario, Canada. It serves students from grades 7 through 12. It is the first of its architectural design by Edward J. Cuhaci in Ottawa, opened in 1990. It was followed by five identical schools in the Ottawa-Carleton Catholic School Board.

History
The school was initially constructed to relieve overcrowding at St. Paul's located a few kilometres to the east.  Because of a construction strike, the school was not ready to open on time, and students had to share the building at St. Paul's for the first two months.  Students from Holy Trinity attended classes in the morning, starting an hour earlier than usual and going until noon.  Students that would have been attending St. Paul's attended classes in the afternoon.  By the beginning of November 1990, all work on the new school was complete, and students moved into their new location.

See also
List of high schools in Ontario

References
Notes

Sources
150 years of Catholic Education in Ottawa-Carleton 1856-2006, Ottawa-Carleton Catholic School Board, 2006
http://trh.ocsb.ca

High schools in Ottawa
Catholic secondary schools in Ontario
Educational institutions established in 1990
1990 establishments in Ontario
Middle schools in Ottawa